In music, Op. 74 stands for Opus number 74. Compositions that are assigned this number include:

 Arnold – Symphony No. 5
 Beethoven – String Quartet No. 10
 Brahms – Two Motets, Op. 74
 Britten – Songs and Proverbs of William Blake
 Chopin – 17 Polish songs
 Dvořák – Terzetto in C major
 Glière – Harp Concerto
 Madetoja – Juha
 Prokofiev – Cantata for the 20th Anniversary of the October Revolution
 Schumann – Spanisches Liederspiel (3 songs, 5 duets, 2 quartets)
 Scriabin – Prelude, Op. 74, No. 2
 Strauss – Lava-Ströme
 Tchaikovsky – Symphony No. 6
 Weber – Clarinet Concerto No. 2